The first season of Got Talent Uruguay, an Uruguayan talent show competition, was broadcast in Uruguay during 2020, from June 22 to December 7 on Channel 10. The judging panel was formed by Orlando Petinatti, María Noel Riccetto, Claudia Fernández and Agustín Casanova. Alongside the main programme, the first series was accompanied by a spin-off sister programme on the same station, titled Amamos el Talento, hosted by Noelia Etcheverry and Kairo Herrera.

The first series was won by opera singer Diego Coronel.

Season Overview 

The idea to produce an Uruguayan adaptation of the international franchise, created by Simon Cowell emerged in March 2019. On July 30 of that year, it was confirmed that actress Natalia Oreiro. From November to December 2019, the production team toured the 19 departments of the country to make the casts, as a whole, they called more than 10,000 people, becoming the version with the most aspirants.

Filming of the auditions began in February 2020, which were held in important theaters in the country: Spanish Theater (Durazno), Politeama Theater (Canelones), Florencio Sánchez Theater (Paysandú), Convention Center (Punta del Este)  and El Galpon Theater (Montevideo). The filming of the second stage began on August 12, 2020, at the Nelly Goitiño Auditorium in Montevideo, which did not have an audience because of the sanitary restrictions due to the COVID-19 pandemic. With the same restrictions, the semi-finals took place at that venue, while the final was held at the Antel Arena.

Semi-final summary 

  Buzzed out |  Judges' vote | 
  |

Semi-final 1 (26 October)

Semi-final 2 (2 November)

Semi-final 3 (9 November)

Semi-final 4 (16 November)

Semi-final 5 (23 November)

Semi-final 6 (30 November)

Final (7 December)

References 

Got Talent Uruguay
2020 Uruguayan television seasons